This is a list of furniture types. Furniture includes objects such as tables, chairs, beds, desks, dressers, and cupboards. These objects are usually kept in a house or other building to make it suitable or comfortable for living or working in.

Seating

Single seat

Chair
Lift chair
Bean bag chair
Chaise longue
Fauteuil
Ottoman
Recliner
Stool
Bar Stool
Footstool or ottoman
Tuffet
Fainting couch
Rocking chair
Bar chair
Poufy
Arm Chair

Multiple seats
Bench
Couch, also known as a sofa or settee
Accubita
Canapé
Davenport
Klinai
Divan
Love seat
Chesterfield

Sleeping or lying
Bed
Bunk bed
Canopy bed
Four-poster bed
Murphy bed
Platform bed
Sleigh bed
Waterbed
Daybed
Futon
Hammock
Headboard
Infant bed (crib, cradle)
Sofa bed
Toddler bed

Entertainment

Billiard table
Celestial globe
Chess table
Entertainment center
Gramophone
Hi-fi
Jukebox
Pinball machine
Radiogram
Home bar
Radio receiver
Piano
  TV

Tables

 Countertop
 Chabudai
 Changing table
 Desk
 Computer desk
 Davenport desk
 Drawing board
 Writing desk
 Pedestal desk
 Kneehole desk
 Secretary desk
 Dressing table
 Lowboy
 Kotatsu
 Korsi
 Monks bench
 Table
 Coffee table
 Dining table
 Drop-leaf table
 End table
 Folding table
 Game table
 Gateleg table
 Poker table
 Refectory table
 Trestle table
 TV tray table
 Wine table
 Sewing table
 Washstand
 Workbench

Storage
Baker's rack
Bookcase
Cabinetry
Bathroom cabinet
Chifforobe
Closet
Credenza
Cupboard
Curio cabinet
Gun cabinet
Hutch
Hoosier cabinet
Kitchen cabinet
Liquor cabinet
Pantry
Pie safe
Stipo a bambocci
Sideboard
Chest of drawers or dresser
Chest
 Cellarette
 Hope chest
Coat rack
 Drawer (furniture)
Hall tree
Hatstand
Bar cabinet
Filing cabinet
Floating shelf
Nightstand
Ottoman
Plan chest
Plant stand
Shelving
Sideboard or buffet
Umbrella stand
Wardrobe or armoire
Wine rack
Commode

Sets

Bedroom set (group)
Dinette (group)
Dining set
Vanity set
Portable Lamps
Patio set

Types classified by materials
 Wooden furniture
 Bamboo furniture
 Wicker or rattan furniture
 Metal furniture
 Plastic furniture, also known as acrylic furniture
 Glass furniture
 Concrete furniture
 Bombay furniture, also known as blackwood furniture

Other

Definition 1: Objects usually kept in a house or other building to make it suitable or comfortable for living or working in
Built-in furniture (see Frank Lloyd Wright)
Campaign furniture furniture specifically designed to break down or fold for ease of travel
Clothes valet
Credenza
Divider, shōji or partition
Folding screen
 Garden furniture
Lamps are covered under furnishings or lighting.
Taboret
Tatami mats used for sitting
Work furniture

Definition 2: Accessories or fittings that are required for a particular function, situation, or setting
Aquarium furniture
Bar furniture
Children's furniture
Door furniture 
Hutch
Park furniture (such as benches and picnic tables)
Stadium seating
Street furniture
 Sword furniture – on Japanese swords (katana, wakizashi, tantō) all parts save the blade are referred to as "furniture".
 In firearms, parts aside from the action and barrel, such as the grip, stock, butt, and comb.

See also

Bedrooms
Casegoods
Decorative arts
Living room
List of chairs
List of furniture designers
Occasional furniture
Wood finishing

 
Design-related lists
History of furniture
Interior design